John "Jack" Hirst (c. 1936 – 19 October 2012 in Wakefield) was a professional rugby league footballer who played in the 1950s and 1960s.

Playing career

County honours
Jack Hirst won a cap playing  left-, i.e. number 8, for Yorkshire while at Castleford scoring 1-try in the 20-45 defeat by Lancashire at St. Helens' stadium on 11 September 1963.

County League appearances
Jack Hirst played in Castleford's victory in the Yorkshire County League during the 1964–65 season.

Genealogical information
Jack Hirst was the father of the rugby league footballer for Hunslet, Keighley, Huddersfield and Oulton Raiders, John Hirst (not to be confused with rugby league footballer who played in the 1980s and 1990s for Wakefield Trinity, John Hirst).

References

External links
Search for "Hirst" at rugbyleagueproject.org
(archived by web.archive.org) RIP Jack Hirst
RIP Jack Hirst
Rugby League world mourning death of a 'stalwart'
Obituary

1930s births
2012 deaths
Bradford Bulls players
Bramley RLFC players
Castleford Tigers players
English rugby league players
Hunslet F.C. (1883) players
Place of birth missing
Rugby league props
Wakefield Trinity players
Yorkshire rugby league team players